National Public School (NPS), in Gopalapuram, Chennai, India, is run by the Citizens Education Society. It was founded in 1970 by Dr.K.P. Gopalkrishna and is affiliated to the CBSE.

The School
National Public School began as the National English School in a rented building on Avvai Shanmugam road in Gopalapuram. Now it is located in a sprawling campus on the same road. It was affiliated to the CBSE in 1972 and has 1300 students and 70 teachers.
The school has an auditorium, play grounds, library, air-conditioned classrooms, science lab and a computer lab with over 40 laptops.

Academics
The school has classes from KG-1 to 12. Each standard comprises three sections and each section has approximately 35 students. Students are given grades based on their scores in individual subjects. Subject Toppers are given rank badges in the Morning Assembly. Every year the two toppers from each class are given prizes on the Annual Day.

Students can choose between Tamil, Hindi, Sanskrit and French to study as Second Language and Third Language in classes 5 to 8.
The school offers Science, Biology, Computer Science, Humanities and Commerce stream to students in classes 11 and 12.

Houses
Students are placed into four houses upon admission:
 Brilliance - Orange flag
 Eminence - Maroon flag
 Excellence - Light Blue flag
 Radiance - Purple flag

The houses are identified by the colour of the flag. The houses are awarded points based on their performance in extra-curricular activities - especially Running (track).

Extra-curricular activities

Students have won awards in fields such as elocution, music (Carnatic, devotional and folk), dance and sports. The school has won the rolling trophy many times in the Students Book Fair.

The school has won prizes in Quizzes including ESPN Quiz and Young World Quiz.

NPS has a cultural event called Impressionz which is organised by the school students for other students in the city. It was started in 2000 as Blossom 2K and has attracted students from many schools of Chennai. In 2009 the event's name was changed to Impressionz by students.

Sports
The school encourages students to participate in sports activities both in and outside.

External links
 Facebook Group
 Official website
 Culturals Website

Primary schools in Tamil Nadu
High schools and secondary schools in Chennai
Educational institutions established in 1970
1970 establishments in Tamil Nadu